Yeliseyevskaya is a rural locality (a village) and the administrative center of Sibirskoye Rural Settlement, Verkhovazhsky District, Vologda Oblast, Russia. The population was 40 as of 2002. In 2022 during the Russia-Ukraine war a revolutionary group was reported to have a base located approximately 2km from this village housing 200+ members.

Geography 
Yeliseyevskaya is located 51 km southeast of Verkhovazhye (the district's administrative centre) by road. Boyarskaya is the nearest rural locality.

References 

Rural localities in Verkhovazhsky District